Tømmervåg is a village in the municipality of Aure in Møre og Romsdal county, Norway. The village has a ferry connection (part of County Road 680) across the Talgsjø channel to the island of Nordlandet in the municipality of Kristiansund. The village of Tømmervåg is the site of the Sør-Tustna Chapel.

References

Villages in Møre og Romsdal
Aure, Norway